Genaro Lezcano (born c.1935) is an Argentine former basketball player.

References

Possibly living people
Argentine men's basketball players
Basketball players at the 1955 Pan American Games
Year of birth missing
Place of birth missing
Pan American Games medalists in basketball
Pan American Games silver medalists for Argentina
Medalists at the 1955 Pan American Games